The 2001–02 Ivy League men's basketball season was the Ivy League's 48th season of basketball. Penn, Yale and Princeton finished the season tied with identical 11-3 records and shared the league championship. To determine the recipient of the league's automatic bid to the NCAA tournament a three-team, two-game tournament was held at neutral sites. Penn's 3–1 record in games with Princeton and Yale gave them the top seed and a bye. In the first game Yale defeated Princeton 76–60 at the Palestra on Penn's campus.  Penn then defeated Yale 77–58 at Lafayette College and received the Ivy League's automatic bid to the 2002 NCAA Men's Division I Basketball Tournament. Ugonna Onyekwe of Penn was named the Ivy League Men's Basketball Player of the Year.

Standings

Statistical leaders

References